is a Japanese voice actress from Kanagawa Prefecture who is currently affiliated with Haikyō. She made her debut in 2016, and in 2018 she played her first main role as Kanata Higa in the anime television series Harukana Receive. She is also known for her roles as Miki Takekasa in After School Dice Club, Suzuno in LBX Girls, and Siesta in The Detective Is Already Dead.

Career
Miyashita started her career after passing an audition held by the voice acting talent agency Sigma Seven. Her activities began in 2016, with a background role in the anime series Aikatsu Stars!. In 2018, she played her first main role as Kanata Higa in the anime series Harukana Receive; she and co-star Kana Yūki performed the series' opening theme "Fly Two Blue". In 2019, she voiced Mayo Ojōsa in Hitori Bocchi no Marumaru Seikatsu and Miki Takekasa in After School Dice Club; she and her After School Dice Club co-stars performed the song "On The Board", which was used as the series' ending theme. In 2021, she played the roles of Suzuno in Little Battlers Experience and Siesta in The Detective Is Already Dead.

Filmography

Anime
2016
Aikatsu Stars!, Student

2017
Chronos Ruler, Student B
Anime-Gatari, Companion (episode 5)

2018
Persona 5: The Animation, Mika
Harukana Receive, Kanata Higa

2019
The Magnificent Kotobuki, Ane-san (episodes 4, 11-12)
Hitori Bocchi no Marumaru Seikatsu, Mayo Ojōsa
After School Dice Club, Miki Takekasa

2020
Magia Record, Classmate (episode 1)
Mr Love: Queen's Choice, Female student

2021
Wonder Egg Priority, Yae Yoshida (episode 6)
LBX Girls, Suzuno
Horimiya, Female high school student (episode 2)
The Detective Is Already Dead, Siesta

2022
More Than a Married Couple, But Not Lovers, Shiori Sakurazaka

Video Games
 Paradigm Paradox as Kaori
 Heaven Burns Red (ヘブンバーンズレッド) as Erika Aoi

References

External links
profile 

Japanese voice actresses
Living people
Voice actresses from Kanagawa Prefecture
Year of birth missing (living people)